These hits topped the Dutch Top 40 in 1971.

See also
1971 in music

References

1971 in the Netherlands
1971 record charts
1971